Igor Lvovich Dorokhin (born August 15, 1962) is a former Kazakhstani-German professional ice hockey player, who played for Kazakhstan National Hockey Team. He is the former head coach of Kazzinc-Torpedo and his farm club Kazzinc-Torpedo-2.

Career
Igor Dorokhin is the graduate of Ust Kamenogorsk ice hockey school. He has begun his playing career at the youth Torpedo Ust-Kamenogorsk team. In 1979, he won in the Soviet Union Youth Hockey Championships. That team was under his first professional coach Vladimir Goltze. From 1984 to 1992, he played for basic team of Torpedo Ust-Kamenogorsk. After Soviet Union collapse, he went to play in Germany. He won at the Eishockey-Bundesliga in 1995, when he was playing for EHC Freiburg. He has lived in Germany 19 years and finished his career in 2012. After that, he come back to Kazakhstan and assigned as an assistant coach of Kazzinc-Torpedo-2. In 2012–13, he was the head coach of Kazzinc-Torpedo.

Career statistics

Regular season and playoffs

URS.2 totals do not include numbers from the 1982–83 and 1983–84 seasons.

International

Achievements
1993 -  Eishockey-Bundesliga
1995 -  Deutsche Eishockey Liga
1996 -  IIHF World Championship Division II
1997 -  IIHF World Championship Division I

External links
 

1962 births
Living people
Augsburger Panther players
EHC Freiburg players
Eisbären Berlin players
Heilbronner EC players
Ice hockey players at the 1998 Winter Olympics
Kazakhstani ice hockey coaches
Kazakhstani ice hockey centres
Kazakhstani people of Russian descent
Kazzinc-Torpedo head coaches
Kazzinc-Torpedo players
Kölner Haie players
Olympic ice hockey players of Kazakhstan
Sportspeople from Oskemen
Soviet ice hockey centres